Steve Denton (born September 5, 1956) is a former professional tennis player for the ATP Tour. He is currently the head men's tennis coach at Texas A&M University.

After becoming an all-American at the University of Texas in 1978, Denton spent nine seasons playing for the ATP Tour. He reached the final of both the 1981 and 1982 Australian Open, and won the 1982 US Open doubles championship with Kevin Curren, attaining career-high rankings of World No. 12 in singles and World No. 2 in doubles. He won a total of 18 tour level doubles titles and, despite reaching 6 finals, never won a singles title. In 1984, his  serve broke the world record, which would not be broken until 13 years later. After retiring from the pros, he moved to Corpus Christi, Texas, coaching several local junior tennis teams. In 2001, he debuted his college coaching career at Texas A&M University–Corpus Christi, where he led his teams to three conference championships and a first-ever NCAA tournament appearance. In 2006, he resigned to become the head coach at Texas A&M University.

For his accomplishments, he is a member of the ITA Hall of Fame, the Texas Tennis Hall of Fame, the Blue-Gray Tennis Class Hall of Fame, and the Longhorn Hall of Honor.

Playing career

High school and college
Denton attended Bishop High School in Bishop, Texas. As a prep, he won four consecutive UIL state 3A singles titles. He then attended the University of Texas at Austin, where he played tennis from 1976–79. He earned all-American honors in 1978. Along with teammate Kevin Curren, he won the U.S. Tennis Association amateur indoor and SWC doubles title in 1979. He completed his college career with an 85–22 singles record, which currently ranks third all-time in school history. He also compiled a 72–18 doubles record, and a 78–27 team record. For his collegiate and professional accomplishments, he was inducted into the Longhorn Hall of Honor in 2006.

Professional
Denton was ranked as high as World No. 12 on the ATP rankings in singles and No. 2 in doubles, both in 1983. Denton was known for his big serve and employed an unusual service motion which involved taking two steps forward prior to striking the ball. Current ATP rules prohibit such a motion (or any service motion involving a running or walking start). In 1984, Denton set a service record of  that would stand for 13 years until it was broken in 1997 by Mark Philippoussis who recorded a  delivery.

He reached six singles finals, most notably the Australian Open (in 1981 and 1982) and the Cincinnati Masters (in 1982). He also won 18 doubles titles (including the US Open and the Canada Masters) in 1982, and reaching 23 additional doubles finals.

Grand Slam finals

Singles (2 losses)

Doubles (1 win, 1 loss)

Mixed Doubles (3 losses)

Grand Slam tournament performance timeline

Singles

Career finals

Doubles (18 wins, 21 losses)

Singles: 6 (6 losses)

Coaching career
Denton made his first head coaching debut at Texas A&M–Corpus Christi in 2001. In his five seasons there, he led the Islanders to three Southland Conference regular-season championships, two tournament championships, and the team's first-ever NCAA Tournament appearance. He was named Southland Conference Coach of the Year twice, in 2004 and 2005. He finished with a 64–48 overall record.

On August 8, 2006, Denton became the head men's tennis coach at Texas A&M University. After struggling for two years in Big 12 Conference play, Denton led the Aggies to a 5-1 conference record and 2nd-place finish in his third year, earning Big 12 Coach of the Year honors.

Coaching record

References

External links
Official Texas A&M coach bio
 
 

1956 births
Living people
American male tennis players
American tennis coaches
People from Kingsville, Texas
Tennis people from Texas
Texas A&M–Corpus Christi Islanders men's tennis coaches
Texas A&M Aggies men's tennis coaches
Texas Longhorns men's tennis players
US Open (tennis) champions
Grand Slam (tennis) champions in men's doubles